Liu Ziming (born 26 June 1996) is a Chinese footballer currently playing as a forward for Liaoning Shenyang Urban, on loan from Cangzhou Mighty Lions.

Club career
Liu Ziming would play for the Shijiazhuang Ever Bright youth team before being promoted to the senior team and then sent out on loan to third tier Portuguese clubs GDU Torcatense and Juventude de Pedras Salgadas. When he returned Liu he would make his debut for Shijiazhuang in a Chinese FA Cup game on 19 April 2017 against Yinchuan Helanshan that ended in a 1-0 victory. This was soon followed with another loan move to Bulgarian second tier club Neftochimic. After his return from Bulgaria, Liu was moved into the reserve team, where he quickly became the reserve league's top goalscorer. This saw Liu return to the senior team of Shijiazhuang and him making his league debut for the club on 20 October 2018 against Xinjiang Tianshan Leopard, which ended in a 3-1 victory. The following season he would become a regular within the team and aid the club to win promotion into the Chinese top tier when they came  runners-up at the end of the 2019 league campaign.

Career statistics

References

External links

1996 births
Living people
Chinese footballers
Chinese expatriate footballers
Association football forwards
China League One players
Chinese Super League players
Cangzhou Mighty Lions F.C. players
Campeonato de Portugal (league) players
Second Professional Football League (Bulgaria) players
Juventude de Pedras Salgadas players
Neftochimic Burgas players
Chinese expatriate sportspeople in Portugal
Expatriate footballers in Portugal
Expatriate footballers in Bulgaria